Göyüşlü or Gëyushlyu may refer to:
Bala Göyüşlü, Azerbaijan
Böyük Göyüşlü, Azerbaijan